The  was an electric multiple unit (EMU) train type for local services operated by Chichibu Railway in Japan from 1986 until March 2014.

History
Twelve three-car trains were converted in 1986 from former JNR 101 series commuter EMUs. Conversion included the addition of a second pantograph on the DeHa 1000 cars and the inclusion of a luggage area at the cab ends separated by a curtain arrangement.

Air-conditioning was added to the end cars from fiscal 1994, with the centre cars in each set left without air-conditioning.

The trains were modified for wanman driver only operation from December 1999. The final train ran on 23 March 2014.

Formations
The formations and former 101 series identities were as shown below.

The DeHa 1000 car was fitted with two lozenge-type pantographs.

Livery variations

References

Electric multiple units of Japan
Train-related introductions in 1986
Chichibu Railway
Kawasaki multiple units
Kinki Sharyo multiple units
Nippon Sharyo multiple units
Tokyu Car multiple units
1500 V DC multiple units of Japan